Lalvarmoi Hmar (born 2 April 1988) is an Indian former footballer who played as a midfielder. She has been a member of the India women's national team.

Career
Hmar played football for Manipur women's football team.

International career
Hmar represented India at the 2005 AFC U-17 Women's Championship and the 2007 AFC U-19 Women's Championship qualification. She capped at senior level during the 2008 AFC Women's Asian Cup qualification.

References

1988 births
Living people
Sportswomen from Manipur
Footballers from Manipur
Indian women's footballers
Women's association football midfielders
India women's international footballers
India women's youth international footballers